The Best Years of Our Lives is the debut live album by Australian rock musician Richard Clapton. The album was recorded in concert on 16 April 1989 and released in September 1989 and peaked at number 23 on the ARIA Charts.

Track listing 
 "Deep Water" - 5:22
 "Trust Somebody" - 3:47
 "Ace of Hearts" - 5:15
 "Blue Bay Blues" - 4:20
 "Get Back to Shelter" - 6:02
 "Night Train" - 5:33
 "Capricorn Dancer" - 3:37
 "Lucky Country" - 4:19
 "High Society" - 4:34
 "Girls on the Avenue" - 4:14
 "Goodbye Tiger" - 5:14
 "Angelou" - 4:15
 "Glory Road" - 5:44
 "I Am an Island" - 6:03
 "The Best Years of Our Lives" - 4:30

NB: All songs written by Richard Clapton.

Charts

Certification

Release history

References 

Richard Clapton albums
1989 live albums
Live albums by Australian artists
Warner Records albums